The 2015 Hama offensive was a military operation launched by Syrian rebels during the Syrian Civil War in the northern parts of Hama Governorate.

The offensive
The Jund al-Aqsa rebel group initiated a large-scale offensive in the northern part of Hama province on 28 November 2015. The initial aim of the operation was to capture the Alawite village of Ma'an. Over the next two days, their assault at Ma’an, as well against the  other surrounding villages, was repelled. A few days later, on 2 December, the Army of Conquest Islamist rebel coalition launched a new assault towards Ma’an, but their attack was reportedly disrupted after they were ambushed at the Morek Hills by the 87th Brigade of the 11th Tank Division.

On 3 December, fighting took place in the Al-Ghaab plains of Hama province, at al-Mansoura, al-Qahira and Tal Zajram, while Army bombardment was reported at Tal Wasit, al-Enkaw and al-Manara. The military reportedly secured the southern entrance of the hilltop village of Tal Zajram.

On 13 December, Jund al-Aqsa renewed their offensive, attacking Ma’sasineh, Al-Buwaydah and Markabat. The following day, the rebels seized the villages of Al-Buwaydah and Ma’sasineh, as well as the Al-Zulaqiyat and Zalin checkpoints ("Jabal ash-Shir"). However, following the arrival of military reinforcements, the Army recaptured both villages and the Zalin checkpoint, with the rebel offensive stalling thereafter. The fighting left 22 rebels, including six foreigners, and nine soldiers dead.

By the morning of 15 December, the military recaptured all areas lost the previous day. In addition, government forces also captured Tell Huwayr hill, overlooking the town of Morek.

References

Hama offensive 3
Hama offensive 3
Military operations of the Syrian civil war involving the Syrian government
Military operations of the Syrian civil war involving Russia
Military operations of the Syrian civil war involving the al-Nusra Front
November 2015 events in Syria
December 2015 events in Syria